Bratton Township is one of the fifteen townships of Adams County, Ohio, United States. As of the 2010 census there were 1,461 people living in the township.

The Great Serpent Mound, a serpent-shaped effigy mound of the Fort Ancient culture, is located within Bratton Township, along with much of the Serpent Mound crater.

Geography
Located in the northern part of the county, it borders the following townships:
Brushcreek Township, Highland County - north
Mifflin Township, Pike County - northeast corner
Franklin Township - east
Meigs Township - south
Scott Township - west
Jackson Township, Highland County - northwest

No municipalities are located in Bratton Township.

History
Bratton Township was organized in 1877. It is named for John Bratton, an early and prominent settler.

It is the only Bratton Township statewide.

Government
The township is governed by a three-member board of trustees, who are elected in November of odd-numbered years to a four-year term beginning on the following January 1. Two are elected in the year after the presidential election and one is elected in the year before it. There is also an elected township fiscal officer, who serves a four-year term beginning on April 1 of the year after the election, which is held in November of the year before the presidential election. Vacancies in the fiscal officership or on the board of trustees are filled by the remaining trustees.

References

External links

Townships in Adams County, Ohio
1877 establishments in Ohio
Populated places established in 1877
Townships in Ohio